The Instituto Libre de Segunda Enseñanza is a high school that depends on the Universidad de Buenos Aires (UBA). It has approximately 1000 students, and it is located in Libertad 555 street, Capital Federal, Buenos Aires, Argentina.
As it is affiliated with the University, it has an admission process that lasts one year and consists of an admission course, which involves multiple exams in Mathematics, History, Language and Geography. Almost all of its faculty teaches in the UBA, and physical education used to be performed at the Universidad de Buenos Aires campus, in Ciudad Universitaria, until 2016.
One of its characteristics is that there is no need to do the CBC (a public admission year to enter the university), because it offers its students the possibility of attending an extra 6th year in the career they have chosen.

The school has a reputation for being strict and rigorous, not admitting students who have been held back, or have more than one subject that hasn't been passed.
The school has also earned several education awards for its academic excellence.

History 
The Instituto libre de Segunda Enseñanza was founded in 1892 by a group of men with experience in education who, before, during and after their activities in the school, occupied important scientific, political and social positions. Almost all of the men who composed the teaching staff of the institute came from the historical Colegio Nacional de Buenos Aires school, to which they resigned collectively as a reaction to the dismissal of the director by part of the government. In  a visit carried out by the Chief Inspector of the Ministry of Education to the Nacional de Buenos Aires school, a small group of students displayed attitudes that he considered irreverent.  Angered, he compiled a report that requested, among other things, the release of the young Director, Adolfo Orma. Twenty-four hours later, the Executive authority decreed the dismissal of Dr. Orma, and temporarily naming the Inspector.
The public protested at the execution of these events, and the papers censored the issue. The students revolted in parts of the city, and the teaching staff, was unanimous convened in the house of the professor Calixto Oyuela, and sent their collective resignation to the Chief inspector.
Calixto Oyuela then proposed to create a new school, one "free of official influences, judgements, and national politic changes", and it was funded on 16 May 1892, under the name "Instituto Libre de Segunda Enseñanza", on Florida 756, with Adolfo Orma as its director. The school was put under the academic protection of the Universidad de Buenos Aires, and received the political support and educational help of Bartolomé Mitre and Vicente Fidel López.
Later, the school moved its facilities to Libertad 555

Facilities 
The school's facilities are: five labs (Chemistry, Biology, Physics, Computer Science, and Arts), a library on the last floor that serves as a study area, and a variety of art and science workshops.

Notable alumni

Enrique Telémaco Susini - Radio pioneer
Oliverio Girondo - Poet
Ricardo Güiraldes - Writer
Roberto Marcelino Ortiz - Argentine President 1938-1940
Enrique Sáenz Valiente - Olympic medalist
Amancio Williams - Architect
Adolfo Bioy Casares - Writer, by whom the school's library is named 
Fernando Sendra - Comic Book Writer
Flavio Ciancarullo - Guitarist in Los Fabulosos Cadillacs

Additional information
Principal: Dr. Roald Devetac.
Degree: Bachelor.
Languages: French, English, and Latin (last two until 4th year).
Sports: Volleyball and Basketball (female) Volleyball and Basketball (male).
Academic Departments: Arts, Natural Sciences, History, and Constitutional Law, Geography and Economy, Physics education, French, Humanities, Computation, Language and Latin and Maths.
Similar schools: Colegio Nacional de Buenos Aires and Escuela Superior de Comercio Carlos Pellegrini

References

External links
Official Website (Spanish)

University of Buenos Aires
Secondary schools in Argentina
Educational institutions established in 1892
1892 establishments in Argentina